Two presidential elections were held in Serbia in 2002:

Serbian presidential election, September–October 2002
Serbian presidential election, December 2002